Calto is a comune (municipality) in the Province of Rovigo in the Italian region Veneto, located about  southwest of Venice and about  west of Rovigo.

Calto borders the following municipalities: Castelmassa, Ceneselli, Salara, Sermide e Felonica.

References

Cities and towns in Veneto